Wyręba may refer to the following places in Poland:
Wyręba, Lower Silesian Voivodeship (south-west Poland)
Wyręba, Kuyavian-Pomeranian Voivodeship (north-central Poland)
Wyręba, Łódź Voivodeship (central Poland)
Wyręba, Warmian-Masurian Voivodeship (north Poland)